The Republic of Lucca was a medieval and early modern state that was centered on the Italian city of Lucca in Tuscany, which lasted from 1160 to 1805.

Its territory extended beyond the city of Lucca, reaching the surrounding countryside in the north-western part of today's Tuscany region, to the borders with Emilia-Romagna and Liguria.

The Republic of Lucca remained independent until 1799. Later the state continued to exist but was, de facto, dependent upon Napoleonic France, and ceased officially its existence in 1805, when it was transformed in the Principality of Lucca and Piombino.

Background 

Within the Imperial Kingdom of Italy, the city of Lucca had been the residence of the Margraves of Tuscany until the time of Margrave Hugh. A certain autonomy was granted by a 1084 diploma issued by Emperor Henry IV, while on his Italian campaign during the Investiture Controversy with Pope Gregory VII. No feudal castle could be built in the range of 6 miles from the city wall. More privileges were granted by the following emperors.

Rise of the Republic 

After the death of Margravine Matilda of Tuscany in 1115, the city began to constitute itself an independent commune, with an administration officially acknowledged by Margrave Conrad in 1120 and by Emperor Frederick in 1162. The city bought the feudal rights from Margrave Welf VI in 1160, hence became subject only to the emperors. For more than 500 years, Lucca remained as an independent republic.

At the end of the 12th century Lucca and other cities of Tuscany created an alliance to fight the neighbor feudal lords and subjugate their lands. This allowed Lucca and Florence in particular to control large territories and to compete for the military supremacy in the region. The 13th century was characterised by political fights inside many communes, including Lucca. As a consequence the republic witnessed the rise of the people faction and change in government structure, as well as participating in a long series of wars between Guelphs and Ghibellines. In 1273 and again in 1277 Lucca was ruled by a guelph capitano del popolo (captain of the people) named Luchetto Gattilusio.

Lucca in the 14th century became one of the most important cities of the Italian Middle Ages. There were many noble families in power, such as the Nuccorini, that from 1300 to 1371 were enrolled in the Supreme Magistrate of the Elderly. Dante Alighieri included many references to the great feudal families that had jurisdiction there, with administrative and judicial powers. Dante himself spent many of his years in exile in Lucca.

In 1314, internal discord allowed Uguccione della Faggiuola to make himself lord of Pisa and then to conquer Lucca. Revolts in the two cities quickly ended Uguccione's regime. In Lucca, the citizens gave the lordship over their Republic to the ghibelline Castruccio Castracani, member of the House of Antelminelli and leader of great political and military capacity. His reign represented the highest peak of the Republic's power, whose territories included the Garfagnana to the north, the coast from the city of Carrara to Pisa to the west, the city of Pistoia to the east (under the codomain of Lucca and Florence), and south the Valdarno constantly disputed with the Republic of Florence. Castracani also succeeded in making Lucca the only antagonist to the expansion of Republic of Florence leading to the victory in the Battle of Altopascio, in 1325, where he defeated the powerful Florentine army chasing them up to the walls of Florence.

When Castruccio died, the city fell into a period of anarchy which saw it subject at first to the dominion of a military company, which had Marco from the House of Visconti as its leader and hostage at the same time. Later the republic was repeatedly sold to different lords who were unable to exploit it due to the hostility of the Republic of Florence. Subsequently, it was acquired by the Republic of Pisa and administered by its Lord, Giovanni Dell'Agnello.

Having regained its freedom in 1370, Lucca returned to a republican government and with a shrewd foreign policy gained remarkable fame in Europe thanks to its bankers and the silk trade.

Renaissance and onwards

During the 15th century the republic was of less importance than the two great republics of Florence and Siena. In the first decades of the century, Lucca falls under the pseudo-tyranny of the Guinigi family.

A judgment of the important historian Giovanni Sercambi from Lucca has been preserved on this period, he especially highlights the conferment of all offices to supporters of the dominant family and also mentions the provisions to prevent the largest assembly of citizens (the General Council) from meeting. The role of this was taken by a Commission made up of twelve or eighteen partisans of the ruling house. Sercambi remembers more generally the restriction of all expenses, except those in favor of the mercenaries, considered indispensable to not live in continuous fears and dangers, and which had to be kept happy, as well as the secret acts of violence committed to get rid of the most rebels dangerous.

The alliance between the Republic that at the time was controlled by the Guinigi family and the Duchy of Milan led Lucca into the ruinous war against the Republic of Venice and Republic of Florence; towards the end of this war, an insurrection finally ended the dominion of the Guinigi family and the republic had to negotiate in order not to lose its independence, which led it to lose parts of its former territories.

In 1429 Florence besieged Lucca to take revenge on the republic. After several days of siege, the republic of Lucca asked the Duchy of Milan for help. The Duchy sent Francesco I Sforza, who overwhelmed the Florentines with his army and forced them to retreat. A few days after the retreat of the Florentines, the inhabitants of Lucca arrested Paolo Guinigi, the leader of the republic, because he was said to have dealt with the Florentines. Florence later paid Sforza to abandon Lucca and, in 1430, Lucca was besieged once again. During the siege the Florentines tried to stem the Serchio to flood Lucca, but due to some errors the Florentine camp flooded. Meanwhile, the Lucchesi asked again for help from Filippo Maria Visconti, duke of Milan, who, once again, acted indirectly (according to a previous treaty Milan could not interfere in the affairs of Florence) asking the Republic of Genoa to help Lucca. Genoa, relying on an ancient alliance with Lucca, asked Florence not to disturb Lucca. When Florence refused, Genoa sent an army of 6,000 men led by Niccolò Piccinino who attacked the Florentines on the Serchio and, after a bloody battle, they were forced to withdraw because the Lucchesi had taken them behind leaving the city.

Merchants from "Luca" living in London appear in English Court records (the plea rolls of the Court of Common Pleas), during the Medieval period, for example: the Podeo family: Lawrence, Nicholas, and Joan, in 1452. 

Lucca managed, at first as a democracy, and after 1628 as an oligarchy, to maintain its independence — alongside Venice and Genoa. It painted the word Libertas on its banners, until the French Revolution in 1789. Lucca was the third largest Italian city-state with a republican constitution ("comune") to remain independent over the centuries, as larger Venice and Genoa also did.

The end of the Republic

Early 19th century
The independent course of the Republic changed in February 1799, before the Second Coalition invasion (1799–1800), one of the Italian campaigns of the French Revolutionary Wars.

French Jacobins created a centralized republic, the State of Lucca, with a democratic constitution. The constitution granted the government to an Executive Directory, with a bicameral legislature composed of the Council of Juniors and the Council of Seniors. The democracy did not last long.

Five months later in July 1799, after the French army retreated, forces of the Austrian Habsburg monarchy conquered the city and established a Provisional government.

In middle 1800 the French army returned, reconquering Lucca. A new constitution for the State of Lucca was published in 1801, restoring the office of Consul of Justice as the president of the Executive branch, with a parliament called the Great Council. The oligarchy was restored.

In 1805, the governance of Lucca was taken over by Napoleon, who merged the State of Lucca with the Principality of Piombino to become the Principality of Lucca and Piombino (1805–1809). He put his favored sister Elisa Bonaparte Baciocchi in place to rule, his only female sibling to gain political power. Elisa began rule as the Duchess of Lucca and Princess of Piombino, based at Villa Reale di Marlia.

See also
Duchy of Lucca — post-Napoleon (1815–1847)
Grand Duchy of Tuscany — (1569-1801) and (1815–1859)

References

 
History of Tuscany
Lucca
Lucca
Lucca
Lucca
Medieval Italy
Italian Renaissance
Early Modern Italy
1160 establishments in Europe
12th-century establishments in Italy
1805 disestablishments in Italy
Client states of the Napoleonic Wars
States and territories established in 1160
States and territories disestablished in 1805
2nd millennium in Italy